Natioro (Natyoro), or Koo’ra, is a Gur language of Burkina Faso spoken by a caste of blacksmiths.

Geographical distribution
Natioro is spoken in four main villages to the west of Banfora, in Léraba Province. These four villages are Kawara and Timba, which are west of Sindou, and Sindoukoroni and Dinaoro, which are north of Sindou.

Sample vocabulary
Sample basic vocabulary of Natioro dialects:

See also
Natioro word lists (Wiktionary)

References

Wara–Natyoro languages
Languages of Burkina Faso